This is a list of the extreme points of Poland, the points that are farther north, south, east or west than any other location.

Latitude and longitude 

 Northernmost point: 
 A beach in Jastrzębia Góra, near the town Władysławowo, Pomeranian Voivodeship, marked by the "Northern Star" obelisk, near Cape Rozewie on the Baltic coast
 Southernmost point:  or 
 Wołosate ridge, near mount Opołonek, Eastern Beskids mountains, Subcarpathian Voivodeship
 Easternmost point:  or 
 Bug River, near Zosin, Hrubieszów County, Lublin Voivodeship
 Westernmost point:  or 
 Oder River, near Osinów Dolny, West Pomeranian Voivodeship

Elevation 
 Highest point:
 Mount Rysy, north-western summit, High Tatra mountains, Lesser Poland Voivodeship  (highest summit of the Rysy , is located in Slovakia)
 Lowest point:
 Raczki Elbląskie, in the Vistula Lagoon, Pomeranian Voivodeship (−1.8 m)

Central point
For many years, the town of Piątek, Łódź Voivodeship has been claimed the "geometrical centre" (not the exact geographical centre) of Poland. In 2018, the exact locations of the geodetic center (centroid) of the whole territory of Poland has been marked in the village of Nowa Wieś, 16 km north-west from Piątek. Its coordinates are 52°11'27.95" N and 19°21'19.46" E.

See also 

 Geography of Poland
 Extreme points of Europe
 Extreme points of the European Union

Geography of Poland
Poland
Extreme

pl:Geografia Polski#Punkty skrajne